Super Smash may refer to:

Super Smash (men's cricket), the men's Twenty20 cricket competition in New Zealand
Super Smash (women's cricket), the women's Twenty20 cricket competition in New Zealand
Super Smash Bros., a video game series
Super Smash Bros. (video game)
Super Smash Brothers (professional wrestling), a wrestling tag team of Player Uno and Stupefied